Victor Pony Prisley Carr (born 12 March 1988 in Monrovia) is a Liberian footballer.

Career 
The striker played previously for Swedish clubs Härnösands FF and Dalkurd FF, Hungary based Diósgyőri VTK and Szombathelyi Haladás, Israeli club Diósgyőri VTK, in Cameroon for Union Douala and Sahel FC as well for SV Heimstetten in Germany. He is also a member of the Liberia national football team.

Notes

External links 
HLSZ profile 

1988 births
Living people
Liberian footballers
Liberia international footballers
Association football forwards
Expatriate footballers in Hungary
Maccabi Herzliya F.C. players
Expatriate footballers in Israel
Liberian expatriate sportspeople in Sweden
Expatriate footballers in Sweden
Sportspeople from Monrovia
Monrovia Club Breweries players
Expatriate footballers in Germany
Dalkurd FF players
SV Heimstetten players